Union Church is an unincorporated community located in Mobile County, Alabama, United States.

Notes

Unincorporated communities in Mobile County, Alabama
Unincorporated communities in Alabama